Carabias may refer to:

 Carabias, Guadalajara, a town in the municipality of Sigüenza, Guadalajara, Castilla-La Mancha, Spain
 Carabias, Salamanca, a town in the municipality of Larrodrigo, Salamanca, Castile and León, Spain
 Carabias, Segovia, a town in the province of Segovia, Castile and León, Spain
 Santa Colomba de las Carabias, a town in the municipality of San Cristóbal de Entreviñas, Zamora, Castile and León, Spain